Kelsey Creek is a creek in Bellevue, Washington on Seattle's Eastside. Originating in the wetlands in the Lake Hills greenbelt between Phantom Lake and Larsen Lake, it flows north and west through the Crossroads neighborhood and then south to Kelsey Creek Park where it turns west and becomes the Mercer Slough just west of Interstate 405.

Drainage basin
Tributaries include Valley Creek, Goff Creek, the West Tributary, Sturtevant Creek, Richards Creek, East Creek, and Sunset Creek. Kelsey Creek flows into the head of the Mercer Slough through a large concrete culvert which has been built to allow salmon to ascend easily via a few short drops of the creek.

History
The Duwamish, whose main settlements were located in what is present day Renton and Seattle, maintained a small outpost settlement called Satskal along the Mercer Slough.

Originally the Kelsey Creek drainage basin included what is now Phantom Lake.  In the late 1800s, however, farmer Henry Thode redirected the Phantom Lake outlet to Lake Sammamish, resulting in a reduced water flow to Kelsey Creek.

For centuries, the Mercer Slough wetlands had been a swamp, marsh, and shallow water area, with the Mercer Slough itself being effectively a shallow inlet of Lake Washington. In 1894, a small sawmill operated at the upper end of the slough and both logs and processed timber would be floated down the slough to Lake Washington. At the time, the slough was both wide enough and deep enough to accommodate log rafts, launches, tugs, small steamers, and stern-wheelers.

Following the completion of the Lake Washington Ship Canal and Hiram M. Chittenden Locks in 1917, the water level of Lake Washington was lowered  exposing the lake bed along the course of the present-day slough. The Mercer Slough was partially dredged in the 1920s to make it navigable to small watercraft.  Today, canoes can be rented to explore the lower waterway.

The King County government and City of Bellevue began acquiring parcels in the Mercer Slough in 1957 for preservation of the wetlands and surrounding natural areas. By 1990,  had been purchased.

See also
List of rivers of Washington

References

External links
Mercer Slough Nature Park on City of Bellevue website

Rivers of King County, Washington
Rivers of Washington (state)
Geography of Bellevue, Washington